Spire Stone is the first product from Spire Health (formerly Spire Inc). It is a wearable stress and activity tracker worn on the waistband or bra strap designed to analyze breath rates to determine levels of tension, calm, or focus. Spire Health Tag, the latest product from the company, is a sleep, stress, and activity tracker.

Description
Spire Stone became available for pre-orders on June 17, 2014. The companion app was compatible with Apple iOS devices and Android devices. The device resembles a grey stone with a large clip on the side, and charges wirelessly with an included charging pad. The Spire Stone has been reviewed in articles by Popular Science, TechCrunch, and USA Today.

Discontinued
In June 2019, Spire Health discontinued all direct-to-consumer products, including the Spire Stone, and ceased to provide support for the Spire Stone with effect from 15 June 2020.

Background
Spire Health was a San-Francisco-based start-up founded by Jonathan Palley and Neema Moraveji in 2014. The Spire Stone was designed in-part from Moraveji's work in respiratory psychophysiology at Stanford University’s Calming Technology Lab.

Spire Stone Specifications 
Stone: 32 mm x 44 mm x 14 mm 
Clasp: 52 mm x 12.5 mm 
Charger: 89 mm x 89 mm 
Battery Life: 7 days

References

Activity trackers